Ministry of Transport, Government of Haryana was established.

List of Ministers
 Ram Bilas Sharma (2014-2015)
 Krishan Pal Gurjar (1996–99)

List of Ministers of State
 Krishan Lal Panwar (2014-Incumbent)
 Dharambir (1987-1989)

See also
 Haryana Roadways

References

Transport in Haryana
Government of Haryana
Transport organisations based in India